The 1995 TFL Statewide League premiership season was an Australian rules football competition, staged across Tasmania, Australia over twenty roster rounds and six finals series matches between 8 April and 23 September 1995.
This was the tenth season of statewide football and the League was known as the Cascade-Boags Draught Super League under a dual commercial naming-rights sponsorship agreement with both Cascade Brewery in Hobart and Boag's Brewery in Launceston.

Participating clubs
Burnie Dockers Football Club
Clarence District Football Club
Devonport Football Club
Glenorchy District Football Club
Hobart Football Club
Launceston Football Club
New Norfolk District Football Club
North Hobart Football Club
North Launceston Football Club
Sandy Bay Football Club
South Launceston Football Club

1995 TFL Statewide League Club Coaches
Peter German (Burnie Dockers)
Stevie Wright (Clarence)
Andy Goodwin (Devonport)
Kim Excell (Glenorchy)
Wayne Petterd (Hobart)
Peter Chisnall (Launceston)
Darren Dennemann (New Norfolk)
Ricky Hanlon (North Hobart)
David Rhys-Jones (North Launceston)
Michael Hibberd & Lance Spaulding (Sandy Bay)
Dale Weightman (South Launceston)

TFL Statewide League Reserves Grand Final
Nth Hobart 22.7 (139) v New Norfolk 12.9 (81) – North Hobart Oval

TFL Statewide League Colts (Under-19's) Grand Final
Nth Hobart 19.10 (124) v Glenorchy 9.9 (63) – North Hobart Oval

TFL Fourths (Under-17's) Grand Final
Glenorchy 12.8 (80) v Nth Hobart 11.12 (78) – KGV Football Park

Leading Goalkickers: TFL Statewide League
Byron Howard Jnr (Nth Hobart) – 104
Simon Byrne (Glenorchy) – 99
Michael McGregor (Sandy Bay) – 93
S.Smith (Sth Launceston) – 79

Medal Winners
Danny Noonan (Clarence) & Geoff Wiggins (Sandy Bay) – William Leitch Medal
Andrew McLean (Nth Launceston) – Darrel Baldock Medal (Best player in TFL Grand Final)
Jeremy Busch (Nth Hobart) – George Watt Medal (Reserves)
Ricky Braslin (New Norfolk) – V.A Geard Medal (Under-19's)
Craig Haremza (New Norfolk) & Damian Triffitt (New Norfolk) – D.R Plaister Medal (Under-17's)

Interstate Matches
Interstate Match (Saturday, 13 May 1995)
Tasmania 14.15 (99) v South Australia 12.12 (84) – Att: 4,198 at North Hobart Oval

1995 TFL Statewide League Ladder

Note: South Launceston were stripped of four premiership points after defeating Launceston in Round 10 due to fielding an unregistered player, four points were awarded to Launceston.

Round 1
(Saturday, 8 April & Sunday, 9 April 1995)
Glenorchy 19.12 (126) v Nth Hobart 18.13 (121) – Att: 1,070 at KGV Football Park
New Norfolk 13.8 (86) v Clarence 7.13 (55) – Att: 1,386 at Bellerive Oval
Launceston 13.15 (93) v Hobart 11.16 (82) – Att: 490 at Windsor Park
Nth Launceston 16.11 (107) v Burnie Dockers 14.7 (91) – Att: 1,620 at West Park Oval (Night)
Sandy Bay 16.14 (110) v Sth Launceston 13.9 (87) – Att: 877 at North Hobart Oval (Sunday)
Bye: Devonport.

Round 2
(Saturday, 15 April & Monday, 17 April 1995)
Nth Hobart 15.14 (104) v Hobart 10.10 (70) – Att: 1,401 at North Hobart Oval
New Norfolk 21.22 (148) v Burnie Dockers 15.13 (103) – Att: 1,231 at Boyer Oval
Devonport 28.27 (195) v Launceston 7.7 (49) – Att: 1,475 at Devonport Oval
Glenorchy 20.16 (136) v Sandy Bay 11.10 (76) – Att: 1,844 at North Hobart Oval (Monday)
Bye: Clarence, Sth Launceston & Nth Launceston.

Round 3
(Saturday, 22 April & Sunday, 23 April 1995)
Devonport 19.11 (125) v Nth Hobart 9.11 (65) – Att: 1,006 at North Hobart Oval
Clarence 18.13 (121) v Glenorchy 9.16 (70) – Att: 1,816 at Bellerive Oval
Nth Launceston 18.17 (125) v New Norfolk 14.7 (91) – Att: 1,351 at York Park
Burnie Dockers 18.8 (116) v Sth Launceston 17.12 (114) – Att: 1,419 at West Park Oval (Night)
Hobart 16.13 (109) v Sandy Bay 12.6 (78) – Att: 1,487 at Snug Park (Sunday)
Bye: Launceston.

Round 4
(Saturday, 29 April & Sunday, 30 April 1995)
Clarence 13.27 (105) v Hobart 6.9 (45) – Att: 1,140 at North Hobart Oval
Glenorchy 12.16 (88) v Burnie Dockers 8.10 (58) – Att: 1,238 at KGV Football Park
New Norfolk 18.25 (133) v Sth Launceston 8.10 (58) – Att: 641 at Youngtown Memorial Ground
Devonport 21.18 (144) v Sandy Bay 17.14 (116) – Att: 2,000 at Devonport Oval
Nth Launceston 24.12 (156) v Launceston 3.5 (23) – Att: 890 at York Park (Sunday)
Bye: Nth Hobart.

Round 5
(Saturday, 6 May & Sunday, 7 May 1995)
Nth Hobart 21.20 (146) v Launceston 7.10 (52) – Att: 867 at North Hobart Oval
Clarence 20.18 (138) v Devonport 15.8 (98) – Att: 1,296 at Bellerive Oval
Nth Launceston 21.30 (156) v Sth Launceston 7.10 (52) – Att: 818 at Youngtown Memorial Ground
Burnie Dockers 30.24 (204) v Hobart 7.6 (48) – Att: 970 at West Park Oval
New Norfolk 21.17 (143) v Glenorchy 9.4 (58) – Att: 2,459 at Boyer Oval (Sunday)
Bye: Sandy Bay

Round 6
(Saturday, 20 May & Sunday, 21 May 1995)
New Norfolk 20.14 (134) v Hobart 9.13 (67) – Att: 1,049 at North Hobart Oval
Nth Launceston 12.11 (83) v Nth Hobart 12.9 (81) – Att: 1,128 at York Park
Sandy Bay 20.24 (144) v Launceston 12.6 (78) – Att: 607 at Windsor Park
Clarence 27.19 (181) v Sth Launceston 11.12 (78) – Att: 590 at Youngtown Memorial Ground (Sunday)
Devonport 11.15 (81) v Burnie Dockers 10.13 (73) – Att: 4,012 at Devonport Oval (Sunday)
Bye: Glenorchy

Round 7
(Saturday, 27 May 1995)
Nth Hobart 13.13 (91) v Sandy Bay 13.11 (89) – Att: 1,043 at North Hobart Oval
Nth Launceston 28.15 (183) v Glenorchy 8.9 (57) – Att: 1,070 at KGV Football Park
Clarence 28.30 (198) v Launceston 6.4 (40) – Att: 719 at Bellerive Oval
New Norfolk 11.12 (78) v Devonport 10.11 (71) – Att: 1,192 at Boyer Oval
Sth Launceston 12.10 (82) v Hobart 8.19 (67) – Att: 581 at Youngtown Memorial Ground
Bye: Burnie Dockers.

Round 8
(Saturday, 3 June & Sunday, 4 June 1995)
Glenorchy 24.16 (160) v Hobart 8.11 (59) – Att: 1,157 at North Hobart Oval
Nth Launceston 30.14 (194) v Sandy Bay 7.8 (50) – Att: 921 at York Park
Burnie Dockers 29.22 (196) v Launceston 8.2 (50) – Att: 604 at Windsor Park
Devonport 17.19 (121) v Sth Launceston 5.15 (45) – Att: 1,134 at Devonport Oval
Clarence 22.13 (145) v Nth Hobart 13.9 (87) – Att: 1,713 at North Hobart Oval (Sunday)
Bye: New Norfolk.

Round 9
(Saturday, 10 June 1995)
Burnie Dockers 13.7 (85) v Nth Hobart 8.10 (58) – Att: 911 at West Park Oval
Devonport 17.14 (116) v Glenorchy 11.15 (81) – Att: 1,057 at KGV Football Park
Nth Launceston 15.13 (103) v Hobart 11.13 (79) – Att: 748 at North Hobart Oval
Clarence 22.16 (148) v Sandy Bay 11.9 (75) – Att: 977 at Bellerive Oval
New Norfolk 14.21 (105) v Launceston 9.5 (59) – Att: 978 at Boyer Oval
Bye: Sth Launceston

Round 10
(Saturday, 17 June & Sunday, 18 June 1995)
Burnie Dockers 15.11 (101) v Sandy Bay 13.10 (88) – Att: 626 at North Hobart Oval
Nth Launceston 17.12 (114) v Clarence 8.18 (66) – Att: 3,687 at York Park
Devonport 18.14 (122) v Hobart 9.14 (68) – Att: 1,101 at Devonport Oval
New Norfolk 15.17 (107) v Nth Hobart 14.18 (102) – Att: 1,777 at North Hobart Oval (Sunday)
Sth Launceston 17.16 (118) v Launceston 13.13 (91) – Att: 729 at Windsor Park (Sunday) *
Bye: Glenorchy.
Note: Sth Launceston later deducted four premiership points for playing an unregistered player in this match.

Round 11
(Saturday, 24 June & Sunday, 25 June 1995)
Nth Hobart 19.17 (131) v Sth Launceston 11.14 (80) – Att: 937 at North Hobart Oval
Glenorchy 27.22 (184) v Launceston 3.12 (30) – Att: 779 at KGV Football Park
New Norfolk 19.10 (124) v Sandy Bay 13.11 (89) – Att: 1,084 at Boyer Oval
Clarence 18.12 (120) v Burnie Dockers 17.6 (108) – Att: 1,217 at West Park Oval
Nth Launceston 12.13 (85) v Devonport 8.13 (61) – Att: 3,053 at York Park (Sunday)
Bye: Hobart.

Round 12
(Saturday, 1 July & Sunday, 2 July 1995)
Hobart 17.14 (116) v Launceston 5.2 (32) – Att: 522 at North Hobart Oval
Glenorchy 14.12 (96) v Nth Hobart 14.7 (91) – Att: 1,196 at KGV Football Park
Burnie Dockers 14.12 (96) v Nth Launceston 13.14 (92) – Att: 1,568 at York Park
Sandy Bay 26.20 (176) v Sth Launceston 19.10 (124) – Att: 571 at Youngtown Memorial Ground
Clarence 15.13 (103) v New Norfolk 8.17 (65) – Att: 2,589 at Boyer Oval (Sunday)
Bye: Devonport.

Round 13
(Saturday, 8 July & Sunday 9 July 1995)
Glenorchy 17.14 (116) v Sandy Bay 15.11 (101) – Att: 1,061 at KGV Football Park
Clarence 16.25 (121) v Sth Launceston 14.10 (94) – Att: 988 at Bellerive Oval
Devonport 20.15 (135) v Launceston 14.8 (92) – Att: 692 at Windsor Park
Burnie Dockers 20.8 (128) v New Norfolk 13.11 (89) – Att: 1,375 at West Park Oval
Nth Hobart 15.14 (104) v Hobart 12.15 (87) – Att: 1,695 at TCA Ground (Sunday)
Bye: Nth Launceston.

Round 14
(Saturday, 15 July & Sunday, 16 July 1995)
Sandy Bay 15.15 (105) v Hobart 16.5 (101) – Att: 905 at North Hobart Oval
Nth Launceston 11.12 (78) v New Norfolk 9.12 (66) – Att: 1,026 at Boyer Oval
Burnie Dockers 19.18 (132) v Sth Launceston 19.15 (129) – Att: 512 at Youngtown Memorial Ground
Nth Hobart 14.12 (96) v Devonport 13.14 (92) – Att: 1,119 at Devonport Oval
Clarence 20.20 (140) v Glenorchy 4.13 (37) – Att: 1,887 at KGV Football Park (Sunday)
Bye: Launceston.

Round 15
(Saturday, 22 July 1995)
Sandy Bay 15.11 (101) v Devonport 14.17 (101) – Att: 661 at North Hobart Oval
Clarence 27.15 (177) v Hobart 9.10 (64) – Att: 946 at Bellerive Oval
New Norfolk 21.14 (140) v Sth Launceston 16.11 (107) – Att: 946 at Boyer Oval
Nth Launceston 24.22 (166) v Launceston 4.4 (28) – Att: 751 at Windsor Park
Burnie Dockers 12.19 (91) v Glenorchy 8.2 (50) – Att: 1,080 at West Park Oval
Bye: Nth Hobart.

Round 16
(Saturday, 29 July & Sunday, 30 July 1995)
Burnie Dockers 13.13 (91) v Hobart 5.7 (37) – Att: 554 at North Hobart Oval
New Norfolk 9.8 (62) v Glenorchy 6.11 (47) – Att: 1,281 at KGV Football Park
Nth Hobart 13.14 (92) v Launceston 6.2 (38) – Att: 505 at Windsor Park
Clarence 18.11 (119) v Devonport 14.15 (99) – Att: 1,280 at Devonport Oval
Nth Launceston 47.14 (296) v Sth Launceston 10.8 (68) – Att: 1,218 at York Park (Sunday) *
Bye: Sandy Bay.
Note: Nth Launceston sets a TFL all-time record score.

Round 17
(Saturday, 5 August & Sunday, 6 August 1995)
Nth Launceston 16.17 (113) v Nth Hobart 13.3 (81) – Att: 1,380 at North Hobart Oval
New Norfolk 11.14 (80) v Hobart 11.8 (74) – Att: 869 at Boyer Oval
Glenorchy 26.26 (182) v Sth Launceston 9.8 (62) – Att: 518 at Youngtown Memorial Ground *
Sandy Bay 10.14 (74) v Launceston 4.4 (28) – Att: 442 at North Hobart Oval (Sunday)
Devonport 12.11 (83) v Burnie Dockers 10.4 (64) – Att: 3,465 at West Park Oval (Sunday)
Bye: Clarence.
Note: Simon Byrne (Glenorchy) sets TFL Statewide record of 17.9 in a single match.

Round 18
(Saturday, 12 August & Sunday, 13 August 1995)
Sth Launceston 15.16 (106) v Hobart 12.9 (81) – Att: 553 at Bellerive Oval *
Nth Launceston 25.14 (164) v Glenorchy 12.8 (80) – Att: 1,019 at York Park
Clarence 30.16 (196) v Launceston 13.11 (89) – Att: 401 at Windsor Park
Devonport 15.14 (104) v New Norfolk 14.15 (99) – Att: 1,599 at Devonport Oval
Sandy Bay 10.15 (75) v Nth Hobart 6.13 (49) – Att: 1,096 at Queenborough Oval (Sunday) *
Bye: Burnie Dockers.
Note: Both Hobart & Sandy Bay home fixtures transferred to Bellerive & Queenborough due to unfit surface at North Hobart.

Round 19
(Saturday, 19 August 1995)
Nth Launceston 14.12 (96) v Sandy Bay 9.15 (69) – Att: 693 at North Hobart Oval
Glenorchy 21.22 (148) v Hobart 10.7 (67) – Att: 842 at KGV Football Park
Clarence 24.14 (158) v Nth Hobart 9.9 (63) – Att: 1,424 at Bellerive Oval
Devonport 21.12 (138) v Sth Launceston 12.7 (79) – Att: 566 at Youngtown Memorial Ground
Burnie Dockers 30.14 (194) v Launceston 11.5 (71) – Att: 946 at West Park Oval
Bye: New Norfolk.

Round 20
(Saturday, 26 August 1995)
New Norfolk 16.10 (106) v Sandy Bay 13.8 (86) – Att: 714 at North Hobart Oval
Clarence 10.12 (72) v Burnie Dockers 9.13 (67) – Att: 1,246 at Bellerive Oval
Nth Hobart 11.14 (80) v Sth Launceston 9.11 (65) – Att: 716 at Youngtown Memorial Ground
Glenorchy 26.15 (171) v Launceston 7.15 (57) – Att: 508 at Windsor Park
Nth Launceston 17.13 (115) v Devonport 7.8 (50) – Att: 2,532 at York Park (Sunday)
Bye: Hobart.

Qualifying Final
(Saturday, 2 September 1995)
New Norfolk: 4.3 (27) | 5.8 (38) | 10.10 (70) | 12.12 (84)
Clarence: 5.4 (34) | 6.8 (44) | 8.12 (60) | 10.14 (74)
Attendance: 3,206 at North Hobart Oval

Elimination Final
(Sunday, 3 September 1995)
Burnie Dockers: 1.1 (7) | 4.5 (29) | 4.9 (33) | 13.13 (91)
Devonport Blues: 2.2 (14) | 2.3 (15) | 7.6 (48) | 8.6 (54)
Attendance: 4,315 at Devonport Oval

Second Semi Final
(Saturday, 9 September 1995)
Nth Launceston: 4.4 (28) | 5.5 (35) | 7.10 (52) | 12.12 (84)
New Norfolk: 1.4 (10) | 5.6 (36) | 8.9 (57) | 10.12 (72)
Attendance: 3,916 at York Park

First Semi Final
(Sunday, 10 September 1995)
Clarence Roos: 3.5 (23) | 6.8 (44) | 12.13 (85) | 22.18 (150)
Burnie Dockers: 4.2 (26) | 8.3 (51) | 10.4 (64) | 10.4 (64)
Attendance: 2,524 at North Hobart Oval

Preliminary Final
(Sunday, 17 September 1995)
Clarence: 6.6 (42) | 10.8 (68) | 11.13 (79) | 14.14 (98)
New Norfolk: 3.0 (18) | 5.5 (35) | 8.8 (56) | 13.11 (89)
Attendance: 4,425 at North Hobart Oval

Grand Final
(Saturday, 23 September 1995) – (ABC-TV highlights: 1995 TFL Grand Final)
Nth Launceston: 4.5 (29) | 6.5 (41) | 9.8 (62) | 9.11 (65)
Clarence: 3.2 (20) | 5.9 (39) | 6.11 (47) | 7.13 (55)
Attendance: 9,448 at North Hobart Oval

Source: All scores and statistics courtesy of the Hobart Mercury, Launceston Examiner and North West Advocate publications.

Tasmanian Football League seasons